The Romanian Olympiad in Informatics is an annual competitive programming contest for secondary school students in Romania. It gathers about 300 high-school students (9th to 12th grade) and about 160 gymnasium students (5th to 8th grade).

The contest takes place over two days, in sessions of 3–5 hours each, and consists of providing computationally efficient solutions to one to four problems of an algorithmic nature. Contestants compete individually. To participate, students must first qualify within their school, then town/city, then county. At the end of the Olympiad, a special contest further selects the top ~20 students for the International Olympiad in Informatics (IOI). Since 1990, Romanian students have won 32 gold medals at the IOI, ranking the country #4 worldwide.

History 
The first Romanian Olympiad in Informatics was held in 1978 and consisted of a hand-written portion, and a computer portion, the latter giving a choice of programming language among Fortran, COBOL and ASSIRIS.

Other editions included:
 2017 - Brașov, 340 high-school students, 20–25 April
 2016 - Bucharest, 21–24 April (gymnasium)
 2015 - Târgovişte, 330 high-school students, 3–8 April
 2014 - Slobozia, 220 gymnasium students, 10–14 April
 2013 - Timisoara, 30 March – 5 April
 2010 - Slatina, 126 gymnasium students, 30 January – 2 February, and Constanta, 287 high-school students in April

See also 
 International Olympiad in Informatics
 Central European Olympiad in Informatics, founded by and often hosted in Romania

References

External links 
 olimpiada.info

Programming contests
European student competitions
Information technology organizations based in Europe